Mozibur Rahman Fakir (7 January 1947 – 2 May 2016) was a Bangladeshi Awami League politician who was State Minister of Health and Family Welfare. He represented Mymensingh-3.

Biography
Fakir was born on 7 January 1947. He graduated from Mymensingh medical college in 1970, then joined the medical core of Bangladesh Army. He was elected to Parliament from Mymensingh in 2001. He fought in the Bangladesh Liberation War. He founded Nasima Nursing Home in Mymensingh city. Fakir died on 2 May 2016.

References

Awami League politicians
1947 births
2016 deaths
State Ministers of Health and Family Welfare (Bangladesh)